"Shining" is a song written and performed by American producer DJ Khaled as the lead single from his tenth studio album, Grateful (2017). The song features vocals from American singer Beyoncé and American rapper Jay-Z. The song was released on February 12, 2017, by We the Best and Epic Records. The song contains a sample of Osunlade's 2013 recording "Dionne" which itself samples 1970's "Walk the Way You Talk" by Dionne Warwick.

Background
The song premiered following the 59th Annual Grammy Awards on February 12, 2017. The single art features Khaled's newborn son, Asahd Khaled.

Composition
Written and composed by Burt Bacharach, Jahron Brathwaite, Ingrid Burley, Shawn Carter, Hal David, Floyd Hills, Khaled Khaled, and Beyonce Knowles, the song features references to the lives and success of the Knowles-Carter couple, including the twenty-one Grammy Awards won to date by the rapper, the platinum records received by the RIAA for each album released, Knowles's twenty years of music success, and twins, Sir and Rumi (born June 18, 2017), are mentioned for the first time.

The song is performed in the key of D minor with a tempo of 112 beats per minute.

Critical reception
David Turner from Pitchfork thought the track "hues closer to those moments of ecstasy than the adult contemporary rap of Jay-Z's post-Watch the Throne career… Jay-Z raps with an endearing mix of self-deprecation and premature paternal pride. Beyoncé, on the other hand, operates with full-on swagger, singing triumphantly about "winning" for the last "20 years," and flashing a smile to even the most dogged haters. Her half-rap cadence mimics the one she used on last year's "Formation," bearing all the marks of effortless skill and confidence. And as is usual, Khaled is the hype man for his own song, his usual ecstatic adlibs sprinkled throughout."

Abbie McCarthy from The Independent wrote: "The song shows three heavyweights bringing all their talents to the party – DJ Khaled has served up a smooth, crisp beat, Beyoncé delivers an awesome attitude-laden verse and then Jay-Z steps in with a new sense of life, he's back to his best bars on this."

Track listing

Charts

Weekly charts

Year-end charts

Certifications

Release history

References

External links
 

2017 singles
2017 songs
Epic Records singles
DJ Khaled songs
Beyoncé songs
Jay-Z songs
Songs written by DJ Khaled
Songs written by Jay-Z
Songs written by PartyNextDoor
Songs written by Danja (record producer)
Songs written by Beyoncé
Songs with music by Burt Bacharach
Songs with lyrics by Hal David
Song recordings produced by DJ Khaled